The Gruinart Flats is a low-lying landform on the western part of the isle of Islay in Scotland. The locale is an important conservation area, having been designated as an SSSI. Much of the Gruinart Flats is a marshy area operated by the Royal Society for the Protection of Birds. This vicinity is known to be an early habitation site by Mesolithic peoples.

See also
 Loch Gruinart

Footnotes

References
 Hunter-gatherer landscape archaeology: the Southern Hebrides Mesolithic. 2001. ed. Steven Mithen, 684 pages

External links

Landforms of Islay
Landforms of the Inner Hebrides
Sites of Special Scientific Interest in Islay and Jura
Landforms of Argyll and Bute
Wetlands of Scotland
Ramsar sites in Scotland